The Third Swedish Crusade to Finland was a Swedish military expedition against the pagan Karelians in 1293.

History
It followed the mythical First Crusade and the Second Crusade to Finland. Viborg Castle was established in 1293 on the site of a destroyed Karelian fort as the easternmost outpost of the medieval Kingdom of Sweden. After the crusade Western Karelia remained under Swedish rule until the Treaty of Nystad in 1721.

The name of the expedition is largely anachronic, and it was a part of the Northern Crusades.
According to the Eric Chronicles (Erikskrönikan) the reason behind the expedition was pagan intrusions into Christian territories. According to the Eric Chronicles, the Swedes conquered 14 hundreds from the Karelians.

Karelians had also been engaged in a destructive expedition to Sweden in 1257 which led Valdemar, King of Sweden (1250–1275) to request Pope Alexander IV to declare a crusade against them, which he agreed.

Birger Magnusson,  King of Sweden (1290 to 1318), stated in a letter of 4 March 1295  that the motive of the crusade was long-time banditry and looting in the Baltic Sea region by Karelians, and the fact that they had taken Swedes and other travellers as captives and then tortured them.

See also
 First Swedish Crusade
 Second Swedish Crusade
 Northern Crusades

References

Other sources
 Linna Martti, ed. 	(1989) Suomen Varhaiskeskiajan Lähteitä  	 (Historian Ystäväin liitto ry) ,

13th-century crusades
13th century in Sweden
13th century in Russia
Northern Crusades
1293 in Europe